The University of Toronto Quarterly is an interdisciplinary academic journal of the humanities published by the University of Toronto Press. It was established in 1931 under the editorship of the philosopher George Sidney Brett. The current editor-in-chief is Colin Hill. The journal accepts submissions in either English or French. The journal is abstracted and indexed in Academic Search, the Arts and Humanities Citation Index, CrossRef, Current Contents, EBSCO databases, MLA International Bibliography, Project MUSE, Scopus, and Ulrich's Periodicals Directory.

References

External links 
 
 print: 
 online: 
Archival papers of George Sidney Brett, founder of the University of Toronto Quarterly, are held at the University of Toronto Archives and Records Management Services
Correspondence from Newton Price Harcourt Brown and George Sidney Brett, founder of the University of Toronto Quarterly, are held at the University of Toronto Archives and Records Management Services

University of Toronto Press academic journals
Multidisciplinary humanities journals
Quarterly journals
Publications established in 1931
Multilingual journals
University of Toronto
1931 establishments in Ontario